The Sprig of Rosemary (Catalan: Lo romaní) is a Catalan fairy tale from Spain collected by Dr. D. Francisco de S. Maspons y Labros in Cuentos Populars Catalans. Andrew Lang included it in The Pink Fairy Book.

It is related to the international cycle of The Search for the Lost Husband and is classified in the Aarne-Thompson-Uther Index as tale type ATU 425A, "The Animal (Monster) as Bridegroom".

Synopsis

The fairy tale is about a man who makes his only daughter work very hard. One day after work, he sends her to collect firewood and so she does. While searching for the wood, she picks herself a sprig of rosemary as well. Then a handsome young man appears and asks why she has come to steal his firewood. She replies that her father sent her. The young man leads her to a castle and tells her that he is a great lord and wants to marry her. She agrees, so they marry.

While living there, she meets an old woman who looks after the castle and the woman gives her the keys but warns her that if she uses one, the castle will fall to pieces. After a time, curiosity overcomes her, and she opens a door and finds a snakeskin. Her husband, a magician, uses it to change shape. Because she used the keys, the castle then falls to pieces. The girl cries, breaking off a sprig of rosemary, and goes to search for him.

She finds a house of straw where the people, living there, take her in service. However, she grows sadder by the day. When her mistress asks why, the daughter tells her story, and her mistress sends her to the Sun, the Moon, and the Wind, to ask for help. The Sun can not help her, but gives her a nut and sends her on to the Moon; the Moon can not help her but gives her an almond and sends her on to the Wind; the Wind does not know where her husband is, but says he will look. He learns her husband was hidden in the palace of the king and is to marry the king's daughter the next day.

The daughter implores him to put it off if he can, and after giving her a walnut, the Wind blows on the tailors sewing for the wedding and destroys their work. The daughter arrives and cracks the nut, finding a fine mantle. She sells it to the princess for a great sum of gold. The almond holds petticoats, which she also sells. The walnut holds a gown, and for this she demands to see the bridegroom. The princess finally agrees, and when she goes in, she touches him with the rosemary which brings his memory back, and they go back to her home.

Analysis

Tale type
Catalan scholars  and  classified the tale in the index of Catalan rondallas ('fairy tales'), with the typing 425A, Amor i Psique. In the Catalan typing, the heroine pulls a thyme bush ('farigola') and meets the enchanted prince; she breaks a prohibition and loses him; she is then forced to search fo him and finds him just as he is about to marry another woman; she uses the thyme to make him remember. However, the tale is classified in the international Aarne-Thompson-Uther Index as type ATU 425A, "The Animal as Bridegroom". in this tale type, the heroine is a human maiden who marries a prince that is cursed to become an animal of some sort. She betrays his trust and he disappears, prompting a quest for him.

According to Hans-Jörg Uther, the main feature of tale type ATU 425A is "bribing the false bride for three nights with the husband". In fact, when he developed his revision of Aarne-Thompson's system, Uther remarked that an "essential" trait of the tale type ATU 425A was the "wife's quest and gifts" and "nights bought".

Motifs
It is "frequent" in Spanish variants that the heroine, in her quest, reaches the house of the Sol ('Sun'), Luna ('Moon') and Aire ('Air' or 'Wind').

The animal husband 
According to scholarship, the form of the animal husband may vary between Spanish and Hispano-American tradition, but the lizard as his enchanted form is "common" to both continents. Similarly, the animal husband appears in Catalan tales as a "repulsive animal", such as lizard, dragon or serpent, or as an animal that is symbolic of sexual potency, such as bear or donkey.

Other motifs 
The unwitting theft is a common motif, but in fairy tales, the usual offender is the father, as in The Singing, Springing Lark or Beauty and the Beast; the motif is found in other folktales, such as the ballads Tam Lin and Hind Etin.

Finding the husband can change shape is a common thread in stories of this type, but the discovery that the husband can become a beast is rare; usually, as in East of the Sun and West of the Moon, The Black Bull of Norroway, The Brown Bear of Norway, The Enchanted Snake, and The Enchanted Pig, the bride finds her animal bridegroom is also a man. Furthermore, the usual disaster stems not merely from the discovery but the attempt to break the spell on him—although it is not unique for the violation of the taboo to bring disaster, as in The Tale of the Hoodie.

The quest is common to all fairy tales of this type, and the specific motifs of the Sun, the Moon, and the Wind are found in others, such as The Enchanted Pig and The Singing, Springing Lark.

In most variants, all the magical treasures are used to bribe the heroine's way to the hero, but the false heroine manages to trick the hero to nullify it, instead of this tale's technique where she actually sells the first two things.

Variants

Spain
Folklorist Aurelio Macedonio Espinosa Sr. collected a Spanish tale titled El Castillo de Oropé ("The Castle of Oropé"). In this tale, a poor broom-maker has three daughters. One day, he is gathering brooms when a hardacho ('lizard') appears to him and makes an offer: the man's youngest daughter for the opportunity to gather all the brooms he can. They strike a deal, but the man sends his two elder daughters in an attempt to circumvent the deal. The lizard notices the deception and the man's youngest daughter goes to him and they marry. At night, the hardacho takes off the lizard skin and becomes a handsome prince, but in the morning puts on the lizard skin again. The lizard husband tells the girl she cannot tell anyone about it, nor lose sight of the skin. Unable to reveal the truth, she is endlessly mocked by her elder sisters, until she says her husband is human, and not a lizard. Her sisters then advise her to burn the lizard skin. While her husband is asleep in human form, the girl takes his animal skin and burns it. The man wakes up and says he is disanchented, but gives a pilgrimess dress and iron shoes for his wife and tells her she will only find him after wearing the iron shoes and reaching the Castle of Oropé, then departs. The girl wanders off until she finds a convent of nuns, where she gains an acorn, and a convent of friars, where she is given a nut. Next, she reaches the house of the moon, the house of the Sun and the house of the Air, and asks for directions. The Air says he can take her to the Castle of Oropé, which he does. The girl finally enters the castle and takes out a splendid spinning wheel to trade with the princess of Oropé for a night with the (now human) lizard prince. She fails on the first night, because he remains fast asleep. On the second night, the girl cracks open the acorn given by the nuns and finds another spinning wheel she trades for a second night. Lastly, she cracks open the nut given by the friars, and finds a third spinning wheel which she trades with the princess for a third night with the prince. The girl manages to ask her husband if he remembers about when her father met him, and how he gave her the pilgrimess dress and iron shoes. The human lizard says yes to hr questions, but the princess forces her out of the room. At the end of the tale, during his marriage to the princess, the human lizard asks the guests abou a key he once had for a golden box, and a second he had made, but managed to find the first one. The guests answer he should keep the first key - which is his first wife.

Professor James Taggart collected a tale from informant Juana Moreno. In her tale, a father prepares to go to the fair, and asks his three daughters what he can get them. The elder daughter asks for a dress, the middle one for shoes, and the youngest for three singing roses. The man finds the singing roses in a garden somewhere and tries to pluck some, but a large snake appears to him. The snake orders the man to have his youngest daughter to wait for the snake at the snake's door. The girl goes to the snake for two nights, and the snake turns into a king. One night, the girl's sisters probe her about the snake, and she eventually tells them about the snake that becomes a king. On the snake's third visit, he comes and tells the girl that, for betraying the secret, she needs to seek him with iron shoes. The girl goes to the house of the mother of the Wind (where she gets a walnut), to the house of the mother of the moon (where she gets an apple), and to the house of the mother of the Sun (where she gets a pomegranate). She learns from the sun that the snake king has gone to another town and married another spouse. The girl goes to the town and cracks open the walnut (which produces a twist of gold), the apple (which produces a spool of golden thread) and the pomegranate (which produces a golden hen with golden chicks), and uses the golden objects to bribe the second spouse for three nights with her husband. The girl goes to the king's chambers and tries to call out to him (in her lamentation, she calls herself Rosita Rosaura, and calls him Rey Culebrón). She manages to wake him up on the third night.

Chile
In a Chilean tale titled El Príncipe Jalma ("The Prince Jalma"), a poor man has a beautiful daughter. One day, he goes to the woods to chop down wood and axes a large trunk as to draw blood from it. An "ugly black man" appears to him and demands the man's daughter in marriage, in exchange for the gold inside the tree. The man's daughter agrees to the marriage and the black man sets up a condition: the wedding is to be held in the dark. The wedding occurs with little complication, and the girl and the black man live like husband and wife for some time. One day, an old woman neighbour comments with the girl about her husband, but the girl answers that she has never seen him! So, the old woman gives her a flint to light up their bed at night. The girl follows the old woman's advice and sees that her husband is a handsome prince. However, a spark falls on his face and wakes him up. He despairs at the fact that his wife betrayed, and tells her to seek him, Prince Jalma, by wearing iron shoes. The girl begins her quest and passes by the house of the North Wind (whose mother gives her a golden hen with chicks and some golden wheat); the house of the South Wind (whose mother gives her a golden spool); the house of the Puelche Wind that blows in the Andes (whose mother gives her a golden comb); the house of the Fraresia, or "Setting Wind", who does know where Prince Jalma is: he is prisoner to an old witch, who intends to marry him to her daughter, and locks him under seven locks. Fraresia promises to take her there, and its mother gives the a little golden bowl ("palanganita"). Per Fraresia's suggestion, the girl uses the golden gifts to bribe the witch's daughter for a night with the prince, since their wedding is to happen in four days time. On three nights, Prince Jalma cannot wake up, since the witch's daughter gave him a sleeping potion, but he wakes up on the fourth night, embraces his first wife and orders the execution of both the witch and her daughter.

Occurrences
The Sprig of Rosemary appears in Hadaway's book, Fairy Tales.

References

External links
SurLaLune Fairy Tale site, The Sprig of Rosemary

Fiction about shapeshifting
Sprig Of Rosemary
ATU 400-459
Catalan folklore